Ezra Chiloba Simiyu is  Kenyan C-Suite executive in the ranks of the Communications Authority of Kenya as the Director General after taking over from Francis Wangusi on 4 Oct 2021.

Career
He previously served as a Programme Officer at Cemiride and Oxfam Novib, as a Human Rights Officer at KNHCR, and as a Project Manager at UNDP. He also held the position of Deputy team leader (Governance) at Drivers of Accountability Programme (DAP) in 2015.

From Jan 2015 he was named CEO of the IEBC. In Apr 2018 he was suspended from his post, a matter that moved to court, before he was ultimately let go.

After IEBC he became Principal Partner at Chil & Kemp Strategies before being appointed to serve as a board member of the Youth Enterprise Development Fund.

In Sept 2021 he was appointed the Director General at Communications Authority of Kenya.

Education
He attended Mutua Primary School in Kwanza County before joining St. Joseph's Kitale High School and then Kwanza Boys High School. He holds a Bachelor of Laws degree from the University of Nairobi, an Master of Science in Major Programme Management (MMPM) from the University of Oxford, and an Master of Public Policy from Central European University, Hungary.

Awards
He was named to the Top 40 under 40 men by the Business Daily in 2015.

References

External links
 Ezra Chiloba at Connected Summit 2022

1979 births
Living people
Kenyan chief executives
University of Nairobi alumni
Kenya School of Law alumni